Muhammad Azraai Khor Bin Abdullah, formerly known as Khor Sek Leng, (born 25 October 1952) is a Malaysian football coach and former player.

Azraai, whom one of the most successful coach in Malaysia when he considered to be one of the best football coaches in the history of Malaysian football especially when he brought Kedah FA to be a legendary football team in Malaysia when they crowned as a double treble champion -  a champion for all three major football competitions.

Playing career

He was a Kedah FA player for Malaysia Cup competition and also was in Kedah Kilat FC (a team of Tenaga Nasional Berhad or formerly known as Lembaga Letrik Negara Tanah Melayu before 1990) for FAM Cup competition from 1969 until 1980. He played as midfielder, right winger and also has skippered the team. Azraai also was a former part of Malaysia national team in the period of 3 years starting from 1975 until 1978. In 1976, He was part of Malaysia squad in the AFC Asian Cup in Iran. He also part of malaysia squad that won Merdeka Cup and King's Cup in 1976.

Coaching careers

Early careers
In 1991, at the age of 39 Azraai was appointed head coach of Kedah Malaysia President Cup team. He worked as part of the club's youth team for several years - 1991, 1994, 1998 and 2002. However his glorious career began eighteen years ago in 1993 when he and his colleague, Azman Haji Eusoff was just an up-and-coming tactician, assisting Robert Alberts to create history with a bunch of great players included his assistants now Muhamad Radhi Mat Din and Ahmad Sabri Ismail, from the second division title without losing in 1992 to clean sweep of the domestic football titles in 1993 – Division 1 (the now renamed Malaysia Super League) and Malaysia Cup.

Kelantan TNB FC head coach
Before return to Kedah, Azraai has previously managed Kelantan TNB FC in 2002 when he was an employee of Tenaga Nasional Berhad (TNB), an electricity company in Malaysia.

Kedah head coach
After late Ahmad Basri Akil brought him in August 2004, with his fantastic "Midas Touch", Azraai gives a miracle for Kedah state football environment after they've been dropped to the last place in 2004 Malaysia Super League competition. Kedah on that time handled by Mirandinha. After Mirandinha left the job, Azraai who returned to Kulim from Kelantan as a full-time TNB employee on that time has rejuvenated the team and creates fantastic achievements in Malaysia Cup competition when he led Kedah through to the 2004 Final, but they lost 1-0 against Perlis FA.

Successive 'double treble'
Azraai now became the only coach, to win double treble champions in successive 2006/07 and  2007/08 seasons. After he clinched the third cup in Malaysian football arena, coach Azraai also regarded the 2006/07 Malaysian Favourite Coach Award in 100Plus-F.A.M National Football Awards as an additional motivation after his team won three titles - Malaysian FA Cup, Malaysian Super League, and Malaysia Cup in 2006/07 season and also as a boost for the future of football in Kedah and in the country.
And a few hours before he creates another historical moment of Malaysian football on 23 August 2008, he once again awarded as the 2007/08 Malaysian Best Coach Award in the same awards after Kedah retained the 2007/08 Malaysian Super League and Malaysian FA Cup trophies for second consecutive times. Azraai deserved the awards after his Kedah wonder boys won the Malaysia Cup final defeated Selangor FA with 3-2 result.

After Kedah
He resigned from Kedah after the 2009 season, which Kedah failed to scale the heights of the previous two seasons, mainly because of the loss of his influential import players due to new ruling by FAM. His problems with the new management team also led to his departure.

He was appointed the head coach of Harimau Muda A in 2010, but resigned later in the year after confrontation with the team's technical personnel and players during the squad training stint in Slovakia.

In 2011, he was named as the new head coach of Negeri Sembilan FA, replacing Wan Jamak Wan Hassan (who ironically took over as head coach of Azraai former team Kedah later that season). Although Negeri Sembilan results were in dire when he took over, he improved the team's fortunes. The pinnacle of the season was where he led Negeri Sembilan to the 2011 Malaysia Cup triumph, beating Terengganu FA 2-1 in the final.

On 15 October 2012, he was announced as Perak FA new coach. Signing a 2-year contract, Azraai resigned from his job in October 2013 after only one season, in which he guides Perak to seventh place in the league, but failed to lead Perak out of the group stage of 2013 Malaysia Cup, which includes a 6-1 thrashing by Sarawak FA.

On 14 November 2013, he was officially unveiled as the new T-Team F.C. head coach. Azraai resigned from his job at the end of July 2014, after T-Team were relegated to Malaysia Premier League.

On 24 March 2015, Azraai was appointed as the new head coach for Kelantan FA replacing George Boateng who was appointed as Technical Director. However three months later, Azraai resigns from his position, with only one win in seven league matches and losing in the 2015 Malaysia FA Cup final to LionsXII.

Azraai was announced as the new head coach of Sabah FA in September 2015, his 1-year contract beginning on 1 October. But less than a month later, he mutually terminated his contract with Sabah.

On 28 February 2018, he returned to Negeri Sembilan as head coach to replace Jorg Steinebrunner who resigned after just 5 games into 2018 Malaysia Super League. However, Azraai were sacked just 3 months later on 10 May 2018, after the team performed no better than with previous coach, and languishing in the relegation zone.

Honours

Coaching

Kedah
Malaysia Super League: 2006/07, 2007/08
Malaysia Premier League: 2005/06
 Runner-up: 2005
Malaysia FA Cup: 2006/07, 2007/08
Malaysia Cup: 2006/07, 2007/08
 Runner-up: 2004

Negeri Sembilan
Malaysia Cup: 2011
Malaysia Charity Shield: 2012

Kelantan FA
Malaysia FA Cup:
 Runner-up: 2015

Personal
100Plus-F.A.M National Football Awards
2006/07 - "Malaysian Favourite Coach"
2007/08 - "Malaysian Best Coach"

Quotes
"To be a champion we must act like a champion." - Fokus Bola, 12 July 2007

References

External links
 Mohd Azraai Khor Abdullah Official Website

1952 births
Living people
Malaysian footballers
Malaysia international footballers
1976 AFC Asian Cup players
Malaysian football managers
Kedah Darul Aman F.C. players
Mohd Azraai Khor Bin Abdullah
Converts to Islam
Malaysian Muslims
People from Alor Setar
Association football midfielders